"Cold Fire" is a song by the Canadian progressive rock band Rush. It was released on their 1993 album Counterparts. The song peaked at No. 2 on the U.S. mainstream rock chart.

Personnel
Geddy Lee – vocals, bass, synthesizer
Alex Lifeson – guitars, backing vocals 
Neil Peart – drums

See also
List of Rush songs

References

Rush (band) songs
1993 songs
1994 singles
Song recordings produced by Peter Collins (record producer)
Songs written by Neil Peart
Songs written by Alex Lifeson
Songs written by Geddy Lee
Atlantic Records singles